The Assistant Secretary of the Army for Installations, Energy and Environment (abbreviated ASA (IE&E)) is a civilian office within the United States Department of the Army. 

Rachel Jacobson, a lawyer and former Obama-era Deputy General Counsel for Environment, Energy and Installations is the current ASA (IE&E); she was sworn in on April 4, 2022.

Roles and responsibilities
The Assistant Secretary of the Army (Installations, Energy and Environment) is the primary advisor to the Secretary of the Army and Chief of Staff, Army on all United States Army matters related to infrastructure, installation policy, oversight and coordination of energy security, environmental management, safety and occupational health.  The ASA (IE&E) is also responsible for policy and oversight of sustainability, safety, occupational health, and environmental initiatives; resource management including design, military construction, operations and maintenance; Base Realignment and Closure; privatization of Army family housing, lodging, real estate, and utilities; and the Army's installations safety and occupational health programs.

Organization
The Office of the Assistant Secretary of the Army for Installations, Energy and Environment oversees the following positions:
Deputy Assistant Secretary of the Army for Environment, Safety and Occupational Health
Deputy Assistant Secretary of the Army for Installations, Housing & Partnerships
Deputy Assistant Secretary of the Army for Energy and Sustainability
Deputy Assistant Secretary of the Army for Strategic Integration

Office holders

Principal Deputy Assistant Secretary

Deputy Assistant Secretary of the Army for Environment, Safety and Occupational Health

The Deputy Assistant Secretary of the Army for Environment, Safety and Occupational Health (abbreviated DASA-ESOH) is one of the four deputy assistant secretaries that report to the ASA (IE&E).

Roles and responsibilities
The Deputy Assistant Secretary of the Army for Environment, Safety and Occupational Health serves to coordinate the army's environmental programs, through providing policy, programming, and oversight. The DASA also serves as the primary advisor to army commanders on Environment, Safety and Occupational Health matters, along with executing the Army's arms control program.

Organization
In order to achieve its goals, the ASDA oversees a number of specialist directorates and organizations; these are:
Munitions & Chemical Matters Directorate – is the primary advisor on the environmental, safety and occupational health aspects of explosive and toxic military chemicals. The directorate's scope includes: operational ranges, historic sea disposal of munitions, and life-cycle munitions management. The directorate exercises control over a number of, both cross-service DoD and US Army, programs; these being:
Department of Defense Explosives Safety Management Program
Department of Defense Recovered Chemical Warfare Materiel Program
Department of Defense Chemical Demilitarization Program
Army 3Rs (Recognize, Retreat, Report) Explosives Safety Education Program
Non-Stockpile Chemical Materiel Project (controlled by CMA)
Sea-Disposed Chemical Warfare Material Program
Low-Level Radioactive Waste Program
Environmental Quality Directorate – controls army programs relating to natural resource and cultural resource legal requirements, as well as Native American affairs, including legal, treaty, and trust responsibilities. Furthermore, the directorate undertakes work in the fields of air, water, and waste legal requirements, environmental impact analysis, and environmental program performance auditing. The directorate's programs include:
Army Conservation Program
Army Environmental Compliance Program
Restoration Directorate – is responsible for overseeing and controlling the cleanup of past contamination for which the Army is deemed responsible, 'at a at a facility or site owned, leased, or possessed by the Army within the United States at the time of actions leading to contamination.' The directorate overseas the following programs:
Base Realignment and Closure Restoration Program
Installation Restoration Program
Military Munitions Response Program
Building Demolition/Debris Removal Program
Formerly Used Defense Sites Program
Army Compliance Cleanup Program
Defense and State Memorandum of Agreement Program
Agency for Toxic Substances and Disease Registry
Safety Directorate – sets policy and standards relating to Department of the Army safety matters and the Army Safety Program; proposes safety programming and funding; and provides safety program management and oversight.
Occupational & Environmental Health Directorate – provides oversight, management, and coordination of OEH programs and services.
Technology Directorate – advises on policy in relation to environmental technology needs and requirements.
Environmental Information Technology Management Program
National Defense Center for Energy and Environment
Army Environmental Quality Technology Program
US/German Data Exchange Agreement for Environmental Technology
Western Hemisphere Information Exchange Program
Department of Defense Unexploded Ordnance Center of Excellence

Office holders

Deputy Assistant Secretary of the Army for Installations, Housing and Partnerships

The Deputy Assistant Secretary of the Army for Installations, Housing and Partnerships (abbreviated DASA-IH&P) is one of the four deputy assistant secretaries that report to the ASA (IE&E).

Roles and responsibilities
The Deputy Assistant Secretary of the Army for Installations, Housing and Partnerships serves to provide assistance, advice, policy, programming, and oversight, of all matters relating to army installations, including: real estate, military construction, engineering, housing, and base realignments and closures. All of this seeks to create sustainable installations to support the army's mission, along with provide an excellent quality of life for serving personnel and their families.

Organization
Residential Communities Initiative
Privatization of Army Lodging Program
Office of Historic Properties & Partnerships – raises awareness , renovates, restores, and preserves the army's inventory of historic buildings.

Office holders

Deputy Assistant Secretary of the Army for Energy and Sustainability

The Deputy Assistant Secretary of the Army for Energy and Sustainability (abbreviated DASA-E&S) is one of the four deputy assistant secretaries that report to the ASA (IE&E).

Roles and responsibilities
The Deputy Assistant Secretary of the Army for Energy and Sustainability serves to provide assistance, advice, policy, programming, and oversight, of all matters relating to the army's ability to access energy and water, in order to enhance the army's operational capabilities, enhance the current facilities, and support the state of readiness.

Organization
Office of Energy Initiatives – serves to oversee, develop, implement large-scale energy projects related to army installations.

Office holders

Deputy Assistant Secretary of the Army for Strategic Integration

The Deputy Assistant Secretary of the Army for Strategic Integration (abbreviated DASA-SI) was one of the four deputy assistant secretaries that reported to the ASA (IE&E). On June 30, 2021, the office was downgraded to a directorate reporting to the PDASA (IE&E).

Roles and responsibilities
The Deputy Assistant Secretary of the Army for Strategic Integration served to integrate strategic installation, environmental and energy policy initiatives and requirements, mustered by the other three deputy assistant secretaries, into the Department of Defense and Army planning processes, and other areas of governance.

Organization
Quality of Life Task Force
COVID-19 Lessons Learned
Installations of the Future Initiative
Regional Environmental and Energy Offices
Regional Environmental and Energy Office–Northern
Regional Environmental and Energy Office–Southern
Regional Environmental and Energy Office–Central
Regional Environmental and Energy Office–Western
Army Environmental Policy Institute

Office holders

References

United States Army civilians
 Installations, Energy and Environment